"Move On" is a song by American rapper Lil Tjay, released on November 20, 2020 with an accompanying music video. It is the second single and a bonus track from his second studio album Destined 2 Win (2020). The song was produced by Avery on the Beat.

Composition
Described as "slow and melodic", the song finds Lil Tjay singing about moving on from a toxic relationship with a woman and what she would lose if they break up. He desires to continue the relationship, but is ready to end it.

Music video
The music video, released alongside the single, features Lil Tjay working in a movie theater and also as an actor in an "old-timey film".

Charts

Certifications

References

2020 singles
2020 songs
Lil Tjay songs
Columbia Records singles
Songs written by Lil Tjay